Acroteuthis is a genus of belemnite from the early Cretaceous of Asia, Europe, and North America.

Sources

 Fossils (Smithsonian Handbooks) by David Ward (Page 161)

External links

Acroteuthis in the Paleobiology Database

Prehistoric cephalopod genera
Cretaceous cephalopods of Europe
Cretaceous animals of Asia
Early Cretaceous animals of North America